Payyanakkal is a small town in the south west area in Kozhikode Corporation, Kerala, India (Coordinates 11°13′22.80″N 75°47′13.07″E.) It is bounded by the Arabian Sea to the west, by the Kallayi River to the north, by railway line to the east, and by the old Beypore Panchayath boundary to the south.  The Payyanakkal comes under Parliament Constituency "Kozhikode" and the name Payyanakkal comes from the name of old tharavadu, which is one of the tharavadu in Payyanakkal whose deity is Payyanakkal Bhagavathi Temple.

Payyanakkal comprises places such as Chakkumkadavu, Kappakkal, Nadi Nagar, Koyavalappu and parts of Kallayi, Panniyankara & Kannanchery. The people there are mostly from the common man, including fishermen, coolie workers etc. The Payyanakkal comes under Parliament Constituency "Kozhikode" represented by Sri. M.K. Raghavan  and Kerala Legislature assembly "Kozhikode-South" represented by Sri. Ahamed Devarkovil.  The entire payyanakkal area (Revenue ward 21) is represented in Kozhikode Corporaration by Sri. Musaffir Ahamed C.P. (Ward-54 Kappakkal), Smt. Jayasheela N (Ward-55) Payyanakkal) and Sri. Bijulal M (Ward-56 Chakkumkadavu)

The notable institutions at Payyanakkal are Government Vocational Higher Secondary School Payyanakkal, AWH College (Chakkumkadavu) etc. Also some primary schools are also situated in this area viz. Kappakkal L.P. School, Sankara Vilasam L.P. School, Nambiveetil School etc.

The people from all sorts of life including Hindus, Muslims, Christians lives here peacefully. There are many places of worships for all religions. The mosque at Chakkumkadavu,  Payyanakkal Bhagavathi Temple are some of them.

The access to this place can be done by crossing the Kothi Bridge from Calicut Beach side and also by crossing the Railway Over Bridge ROB at Panniyankara on NH-17 inaugurated in December 2016. Entering to Gopala Swami Iyyengar Road, and is connected to the Old Beypore Road or Old Military Road. This Old Military Road is known to have been built by the Tippu Sulthan or by the British for moving the arms through the coastal belt.  This road connects the ferry at Nadi Nagar (North) on Kallai River and passes through the Beypore Panchayath (Marad area) and connects the Chaliyam at Beypore Ferry (South).

The noted socio-cultural institution in this area is Desaparakasini Reading Room and Library which was established in 1945 by a group of young people whose mind was thirsted for India's freedom.  Some of them are Kadapayil Kunjhi pennu, Kanangot Achuthan, Mannambalath Samikutty, Kalathummarath Rarichan, Ponpara Ramakrishnan Vydiar ,  etc.  As the time goes this library is still serving the light of knowledge to people from all sorts of life without any separation in Religion, caste etc.  Another such institution is Suhuruth Sangam at Chakkumkadavu, a place near to Payyanakkal.

The only secondary educational institution in this area is Government Vocational Higher Secondary School situated in 75 cents of land for teaching about 2500 students by 70 teachers and staffs.  This school was once lower primary, up-graded to upper primary and then to High school in 1980.

References

Villages in Kozhikode district
Kozhikode north
Kozhikode beach